San Antonio Gaelic Athletic Club known as The San Patricios is a Gaelic Athletic Association club in San Antonio, Texas and a member of the North American GAA since 2012. Currently the club has a men's Gaelic Football team, and a ladies' football team. Their club badge features the Alamo, as well as the San Antonio Riverwalk.  The SAGAC is registered with the State of Texas as a Domestic Nonprofit Corporation.

History
San Antonio Gaelic Athletic Club (Cumann Lúthchleas Gael Naomh Antaine), or the San Patricios was formed in San Antonio, Texas in 2011.

Uniform
The team kit is taken directly from the sky blue found on two of the earliest Texas flags of independence: “Texas and Liberty” was inscribed on one side and a Latin inscription “Ubi, libertas habitat, ibi nostra patria est” (“Where liberty dwells, there is my country”) was also inscribed on the other.

The green found on the jersey represents the country that created Gaelic football, Ireland.

Sponsors
The Executive Club Sponsor of the SAGAC is the Lion and Rose Restaurant and Pub. GLI the distributor of Guinness and Harp Lager have become major sponsors as of fall 2012

The Irish Cultural Society of San Antonio, Ancient Order of Hibernians Columkille Division 1, and The Harp & Shamrock Society of Texas, all San Antonio Irish organizations have all been long time supporters and partners of the SAGAC.  This year (2014), that will be commemorated as their crests will be added the 2014 SAGAC San Patricio Jerseys.

Pub League
In September 2011 the Lion and Rose Restaurant and Pub officially announced its decision to become the Sponsor of the SAGAC Pub League.  The SAGAC had made plans to follow in the footsteps of the Dallas GAA Team, "Fionn McCumhaill's Gaa Dallas" by creating a Pub League to help promote the Gaelic Football and increase the amount of competitive play time for each member.  The SAGAC announced that the two teams of the inaugural Pub League would be named "The San Patricios" (named after the St. Patrick's Battalion of the Mexican American War) and the "Irish Citizen Army" named after James Connolly's Socialist Revolutionaries.

Active Roster
As of February 2014, the SAGAC has 58 men & women on their active roster (those who have played in either a National Tournament, Texas League or Pub League game).  The Club is managed by Adrian Brett.

References 

Gaelic football clubs in the United States
Gaelic Athletic Association clubs established in 2011
2011 establishments in Texas
Sports in San Antonio